The 2017–18 National League 2 South is the ninth season (31st overall) of the fourth tier (south) of the English domestic rugby union competitions since the professionalised format of the second division was introduced.

On 7 April 2018 Broadstreet became the first club to be relegated, a 12–16 defeat away to fellow strugglers Barnstaple condemning them to the drop with three games to go.  On 21 April Cinderford became champions with a game to go following a narrow 21–19 win away to Bury St Edmunds.  Cinderford were easily the best team in the division, finishing 12 points clear of second place Chinnor, who on most other seasons would have been good enough to finish champions but instead had to settle for the promotion playoff game.  In winning the league title Cinderford set several National League 2 South records including winning the most games (29) and gaining the most points (143).

The battle for the final two relegation spots was one of the most keenest in several years with three teams threatened by the drop on the last day of the season.  In the end it was Wimbledon and Barnstaple who went down on the 28 April, despite Barum getting a 17–14 win at home against the Londoners, as Old Redcliffians managed to win at home to Redruth.  Old Reds had looked dead certs for relegation earlier in the season but turned it around with eight wins in the second half (compared to just 2 before Christmas) of the season to stay safe by 3 points, even leapfrogging 13th placed London Irish Wild Geese who had secured safety the week before.  Wimbledon also did well in the second half of the season getting eight wins (compared to one in the first half) but were ultimately left with two much to do and were 7 points from safety after their defeat at Pottingham Road.  Barnstaple, by contrast, had looked safe earlier in the season but endured a torrid second half with just four wins after Christmas (for a total of ten overall).  Injuries, along with poor try scoring and improvements from the teams around them, were primary contributors to Barum's downfall.

On 5 May 2018 Chinnor would join Cinderford in the 2018–19 National League 1 after they defeated 2017–18 National League 2 North runners up Sedgley Park 40–31 in the promotion play-off game played at Kingsey Road.

Structure
The league consists of sixteen teams with all the teams playing each other on a home and away basis to make a total of thirty matches each. There is one automatic promotion place, one play-off place and three relegation places. The champions are promoted to the 2018–19 National League 1 and the runners-up play the second-placed team in the 2017–18 National League 2 North with the winner being promoted. The last three teams are relegated to either London & South East Premier or South West Premier depending on the geographical location of the team (in some cases teams may join the Midlands regional leagues).

The results of the matches contribute points to the league as follows:

4 points are awarded for a win
2 points are awarded for a draw
0 points are awarded for a loss, however
1 losing (bonus) point is awarded to a team that loses a match by 7 points or fewer
1 additional (bonus) point is awarded to a team scoring 4 tries or more in a match.

Participating teams and locations
Twelve of the teams listed below participated in the 2016–17 National League 2 South season. The 2016–17 champions Bishop's Stortford and play-off winners Old Elthamians, who won the promotion play-off against Sale FC, were promoted into the 2017–18 National League 1, while no sides located in the south were relegated. The two relegated sides from National League 2 South are Exmouth (who drop to South West Premier) and Barnes (who drop to London & South East Premier). Usually three sides are relegated but when RFU Championship side London Welsh went into liquidation in the spring of 2017 it granted a reprieve for the 14th placed side in either National League 2 North or National League 2 South depending on comparable points, which in the end turned out to be Barnstaple.

The promoted teams are Old Redcliffians who finished as champions of National League 3 South West (now South West Premier), while Tonbridge Juddians (champions) and Wimbledon (playoffs) came up from National League 3 London & SE (now London & South East Premier). Broadstreet were also included in the division when they were level transferred from National League 2 North having been promoted as champions of National League 3 Midlands (now Midlands Premier). Broadstreet's inclusion came due to an imbalance of teams as both Bishop's Stortford and Old Elthamians had gone up into National League 1 coupled with no teams coming down the opposite way, and as the most southerly club, Broadstreet were deemed the most suitable for a level transfer.

League table

Results

Round 1

Round 2

Round 3

Round 4

Round 5

Round 6

Round 7

Round 8

Round 9

Round 10

Round 11

Round 12

Round 13

Round 14

Round 15

Round 16

Round 17

Round 18

Round 19

Round 20

Round 21

Round 22

Round 23

Round 24 

Postponed due to bad weather (snow).  Game rescheduled to 17 March 2018.

Postponed due to bad weather (snow).  Game rescheduled to 17 March 2018.

Postponed due to bad weather (snow).  Game rescheduled to 17 March 2018.

Postponed due to bad weather (snow).  Game rescheduled to 17 March 2018.

Postponed due to bad weather (snow).  Game rescheduled to 17 March 2018.

Postponed due to bad weather (snow).  Game rescheduled to 17 March 2018.

Postponed due to bad weather (snow).  Game rescheduled to 17 March 2018.

Round 25

Round 24 (rescheduled games) 

Rescheduled from 3 March 2018.

Rescheduled from 3 March 2018.

Rescheduled from 3 March 2018.

Rescheduled from 3 March 2018.

Rescheduled from 3 March 2018.

Rescheduled from 3 March 2018.

Game originally rescheduled from 3 March 2018 but postponed again due to bad weather (snow).  Game to be rescheduled for 30 March 2018.

Round 26

Round 24 (rescheduled game) 

Game originally rescheduled from 3 March 2018 & then 18 March 2018 when it was postponed again.

Round 27

Broadstreet are relegated.

Round 28

Round 29

Cinderford are champions.

Round 30

Barnstaple and Wimbledon are both relegated.

Promotion play-off
Each season, the runners-up in the National League 2 North and National League 2 South participate in a play-off for promotion to National League 1.  Chinnor were runners up in the 2017–18 National League 2 South, and because they had a better record than the 2017–18 National League 2 North runners up, Sedgley Park, they host the play-off match.

Attendances
 Does not include promotion play-off.

Individual statistics
 Note that points scorers includes tries as well as conversions, penalties and drop goals. Appearance figures also include coming on as substitutes (unused substitutes not included).  Does not include promotion playoff.

Top points scorers

Top try scorers

Season records

Team
Largest home win — 67 points
81 - 14 Taunton Titans at home to Worthing Raiders on 8 October 2017
Largest away win — 73 points
90 - 17 Cinderford away to Henley Hawks on 16 September 2017
Most points scored — 90
90 - 17 Cinderford away to Henley Hawks on 16 September 2017
Most tries in a match — 14
Cinderford away to Henley Hawks on 16 September 2017
Most conversions in a match — 10
Cinderford away to Henley Hawks on 16 September 2017
Most penalties in a match — 5 (2)
Clifton at home to Canterbury on 11 November 2017
Old Redcliffians at home to Worthing Raiders on 7 April 2018
Most drop goals in a match — 2
Broadstreet away to Wimbledon on 9 December 2017

Attendances
Highest — 1,016
Chinnor at home to Henley Hawks on 9 September 2017
Lowest — 89
Clifton at home to Bury St Edmunds on 17 March 2018
Highest average attendance — 774
Redruth
Lowest average attendance — 157	
Clifton

Player
Most points in a match — 30
 Ollie Rice for Taunton Titans at home to Wimbledon on 13 January 2018
Most tries in a match — 6
 Ollie Rice for Taunton Titans at home to Wimbledon on 13 January 2018
Most conversions in a match — 10
 James Moffat for Cinderford away to Henley Hawks on 16 September 2017
Most penalties in a match — 5 (2)
 Bradley Barnes for Clifton at home to Canterbury on 11 November 2017
 Kieran Hill for Old Redcliffians at home to Worthing on 7 April 2018
Most drop goals in a match — 2
 Clifford Hodgson for Broadstreet away to Wimbledon on 9 December 2017

Notes

See also
 English rugby union system
 Rugby union in England

References

External links
 NCA Rugby

2017-18
4S